Jan Hieronimowicz Chodkiewicz  (1537 – 4 August 1579) was a 16th-century Polish-Lithuanian noble. He was Grand Pantler of Lithuania 1559, general starost of Samogitia 1563, Elder of Samogitia 1564, starost of Telšiai and Plateliai 1566, Livonia Hetman and governor, Grand Marshal of Lithuania 1566, Kaunas starost 1569,  Count on Shkloŭ 1568, Vilnius castellan 1574.

Biography

He was one of the most famous Polish-Lithuanian magnates of the 16th century. Raised a Calvinist he studied at the Universities of Königsberg, Leipzig, and Wittenberg, and entered in the service of Emperor Charles V from 1552 to 1555. After that he entered the service of the Grand Duke of Lithuania. In 1558 Jan Chodkiewicz was made Livonia Hetman and sent to defend Livonia against Tsar Ivan IV 'the Terrible' who was trying to enforce a passage to the Baltic Sea. With the help of Michael Radziwiłł, Great Chancellor of Lithuania, he succeeded in attaching Livonia to Lithuania. But this territory remained for long the main target of Russian attacks. In 1564 he became Elder of Samogitia, in 1566 Grand Marshal of Lithuania and governor of Livonia (1566–78, with headquarter at Sigulda near Riga), and in 1574 Castellan of Vilnius.

As his uncle he was a strong opponent to the Union of Lithuania with Poland. The Lithuanian delegation to the meetings preparing the Act of Union between Poland and Lithuania was led by Jan, who insisted in a long impassioned speech on the equality and independence of the two nations. Finally "bowing to the king's power, he pointed out those parts of the Act of Union which were unacceptable to Lithuania and he stated that he yielded to the King's will only with the deepest sorrow". In practice the Union of Lublin in 1589 made sure that the Grand Duchy of Lithuania retained its own form of government and separate laws until the end of the joint state in 1795.

In 1570 Jan Hieronimowicz converted to Catholicism and became a great benefactor of the Jesuits.

He married the Calvinist Krystyna Zborowska before 1559 in Krakow, daughter of Marcin Zborowski, castellan of Krakow, and Anna Konarska. She remained Calvinist despite his conversion and raised some of their daughters in that religion despite their father's will.

They had issue: Hieronim was born at Vilnius in 1559; Aleksander at Trakai in 1560; Jan Karol at Vilnius in 1560-61; Anna at Vilnius in 1562; Zofia at Vilnius in 1564, Elzbieta at Vilnius in 1568; and Aleksandra at Vilnius in 1576.

He died on 4 August 1579 and was buried in Vilnius Cathedral.

Marriage and issue

Jan Hieronim married Krystyna Zborowska h. Jastrzębiec (c. 1540-1588), daughter of Marcin Zborowski h. Jastrzębiec and Anna Konarska h. Abdank, the daughter of Stanisław Konarski h. Abdank and Zofia Lanckorońska h. Zadora, in 1559, and had seven children:

 Aleksander Chodkiewicz (1560-1626), voivode of Troki, married Eufemia Sienieńska h. Dębno, the daughter of voivode of Podole Jan Sienieński h. Dębno and Katarzyna Korniakt h. Krucyni, the daughter of Konstanty Korniakt h. Krucyni
 Jan Karol Chodkiewicz (1561-1621), voivode of Wilno and Hetman, married Zofia Mielecka h. Gryf, the daughter of voivode of Podole and Hetman Mikołaj Mielecki h. Gryf and Princess Elżbieta Radziwiłł h. Trąby. His second wife was Princess Anna Alojza Ostrogska h. Ostrogski, the daughter of voivode of Wołyń Prince Aleksander Ostrogski h. Ostrogski and Anna Kostka h. Dąbrowa
 Hieronim Chodkiewicz (died 1576), unmarried
 Zofia Chodkiewicz (died 1576), married Grand Marshal of Lithuania Krzysztof Drohostajski h. Leliwa
 Anna Chodkiewicz (died 1626), married Prince Joachim Korecki h. Pogoń Litewska 
 Aleksandara Chodkiewicz, married Prince Adam Wiśniowiecki h. Korybut 
 Elżbieta Chodkiewicz, married Prince Jan Żyliński and castelan of Navahrudak Samuel Wołłowicz h. Bogorya

Ancestry

See also
 House of Chodkiewicz
 Lithuanian nobility
 Ruthenian nobility
 Grand Duchy of Lithuania

Sources

Danuta Bogdan, Students of the Republic at the University of Königsberg, in Królewice and Poland, Olsztyn 1993, p 82.

Leszek Kieniewicz the Senate for the Stefan Batory Foundation, Warsaw 2000, p 299.

Joseph Janowski: Jan Chodkiewicz Hieronimowicz. In: Polish Biographical Dictionary . T. 3: Brozek Jan – Chwalczewski Francis. Cracow : Polish Academy of Learning – Main Ingredients in bookstores Gebethner and Wolff, 1937, pp. 361–363. Reprint: Department of National Theatre. Ossolińskich, Kraków 1989, .

References

External links
 Genealogy of Chodkiewicz family.
 Full interactive family tree .

Secular senators of the Polish–Lithuanian Commonwealth
Jan Hieronim Chodkiewicz
Converts to Roman Catholicism from Calvinism
Polish Roman Catholics
Hetmans
People from Livonia
1537 births
1579 deaths
16th-century Lithuanian people
16th-century Polish nobility
University of Wittenberg alumni
Leipzig University alumni
University of Königsberg alumni
Burials at Vilnius Cathedral
Lithuanian Roman Catholics
Duchy of Livonia
Grand Marshals of the Grand Duchy of Lithuania
Elders of Samogitia
16th-century Polish landowners